Rebecca Catherine Anne Wheatley (born 25 April 1965) is a British actress and musician.

Wheatley grew up in Teddington, Middlesex, where she went to St Catherine's convent school, before gaining her BA in English literature from the University of Wales, Lampeter.

She sang in “In the Smoke”, S5:E7 of Pie in the Sky (1997). Wheatley is best known as Amy Howard, the receptionist in the BBC's Casualty drama, a role which she played for four years from September 1997 until March 2001. She was a regular panellist on Loose Women in 2002.

Although Wheatley originally trained as a classical singer, she has become well known for various types of popular music. She has sung in many of the cabaret venues in the West End of London, including The Café Royal, The Ritz and The Savoy. She has also sung at the Grand Opera House in Belfast in televised performances for BBC Northern Ireland, and at the Royal Albert Hall for The TV Times  'Christmas Carols with the Stars'  event.

She played the character of Miss Sherman, the strict English teacher, in the West End musical, Fame and Julie Johnson in the West End production of Bad Girls: The Musical.

While in Casualty, she recorded two Top 10 singles; "Everlasting Love" with the Casualty cast, and "Stay With Me (Baby)" solo, as well as a solo album, Time Stands Still.

On 4 December 2007, she was a guest on The Paul O'Grady Show where she talked about her 12.5 stone (175 lb) weight loss after following the Slimming World plan, to coincide with the release of her weight-loss DVD.

She is a supporter of international gay rights  and The Kaleidoscope Trust.

References

External links

1965 births
Living people
Alumni of the University of Wales, Lampeter
Wheatley, Rebecca
English television actresses
Actresses from London
People from Hounslow